Beamer is a LaTeX document class for creating presentation slides, with a wide range of templates and a set of features for making slideshow effects.

It supports pdfLaTeX, LaTeX + dvips, LuaLaTeX and XeLaTeX. The name is taken from the German word "Beamer" as a pseudo-anglicism for "video projector".

Method
The Beamer class is not the first LaTeX class for creating presentations, and like many of its predecessors (such as slides, seminar, prosper, powerdot), it has special syntax for defining "slides" (known in Beamer as "frames").

Slides can be built up on-screen in stages as if by revealing text that was previously hidden or covered. This is handled with PDF output by creating successive pages that preserve the layout but add new elements, so that advancing to the next page in the PDF file appears to add something to the displayed page, when in fact it has merely redrawn the page.

The list of features supported by Beamer is quite long. The most important features, according to the user guide are:

 Beamer can be used with pdfLaTeX, LaTeX+dvips, LuaLaTeX and XeLaTeX. LaTeX+dvipdfm isn’t supported.
 The standard commands of LaTeX still work. A \tableofcontents will still create a table of contents, \section is still used to create structure, and itemize still creates a list.
 Overlays and dynamic effects can be easily created.
 The appearance of presentations can be modified using themes.
 The layout, the colors, and the fonts used in a presentation can easily be changed globally, while preserving control over the most minute detail.
 A special style file allows for the use the LaTeX source of a presentation directly in other LaTeX classes such as article or book. This makes it easy to create presentations out of lecture notes or lecture notes out of presentations.
 The final output is typically a PDF file, making it highly portable and worry-free, in the sense that a given presentation will always look the same no matter the machine it is opened on.

Source code for Beamer presentations, like any other LaTeX file, can be created using any text editor, but there is specific support for Beamer syntax in AUCTeX and LyX.

Beamer supports syntax of other LaTeX presentation packages, including Prosper, Powerdot and Foils, by using compatibility packages.

Output options
Beamer provides the ability to make "handouts", which is a version of the output suitable for printing without the dynamic features, so that the printed version of a slide shows the final version that will appear during the presentation. For actually putting more than one frame on the paper, the pgfpages package is to be used.

An "article" version is also available, rendered on standard sized paper (like A4 or letter), with frame titles used as paragraph titles, no special slide layout/colors, keeping the sectioning. This version is suitable for lecture notes or for having a single source file for an article and the slides for the talk about this article.

Dependencies
Beamer depends on the PGF and xcolor packages for some of its features.

See also

 Powerdot – a LaTeX class for making professional-looking presentation slides
 Wiki tutorial on Beamer- A tutorial on how to use Beamer class.

References

Further reading

External links

 Beamer home page
 beamerposter – a Beamer extension for scientific conference posters in DIN-A0 size or bigger
 Till Tantau, Joseph Wright, Vedran Miletić (2015) User's guide – from www.ctan.org
 Beamer Theme Matrix
 wiki2beamer: Tool to create Beamer presentations from a wiki-like syntax
 Dohmen, Klaus (2010) Dual Screen Presentations with the LaTeX Beamer Class under X – from The PracTeX Journal
 Beamer2Thesis
 BeamerikZ - A Latex class for creating TikZ based Beamer presentations

Tutorials
 Introduction to Beamer – How to make a presentation
Beamer Presentations: A 5-Part Tutorial for Beginners (Overleaf)
 Using beamer.cls: "An intentionally incomplete guide" from LaTeX for Logicians
 Beamer by Example from PracTEX Journal, many examples of both TeX source and formatted output
 Introduction to Beamer on Wikibooks
 A presentation using the LaTeX Beamer class (short guide – samples)

Free presentation software
Free TeX software
Presentation software
TeX SourceForge projects